Alsea High School is a public high school in Alsea, Oregon, United States.

Recent achievements
In 2008, 100% of the school's seniors received their high school diploma. Of 12 students, 12 graduated and none dropped out.

References

High schools in Benton County, Oregon
Public high schools in Oregon
Public middle schools in Oregon